is a Shinto shrine located in Ōtsu, Shiga, Japan.

Enshrined gods 
 Hikohohodemi
 Ōnamuchi
 Kunitokotachi
 Tarashinakatsuhiko

History 
The Tenson Shrine was established in 782 and purified by Emperor Heizei in 806.

References 
 Hieizan Rekishi no Sampomichi, Kodansha, 1995, 
 天孫神社：由緒

External links 
天孫神社 - The Tenson Shrine's official website (Japanese)

Buildings and structures in Ōtsu
Shinto shrines in Shiga Prefecture